is a video game character in the Metal Gear series by Hideo Kojima. She was originally a character from the 1994 Konami adventure game Policenauts, which was directed by Hideo Kojima. After her original appearance, she was redesigned and reintroduced in Metal Gear Solid as Solid Snake's partner.

Character design
Meryl Silverburgh in the Metal Gear series is based on a supporting character of the same name in Hideo Kojima's earlier game, Policenauts (1994), where Meryl was originally designed by Tomiharu Kinoshita. Kojima liked the character so much that he used her name, likeness, voice actress (Kyoko Terase) and other characteristics to the Metal Gear version of Meryl. Meryl's partner in Policenauts, Dave Forrest, also shares the same given name Solid Snake has, whose true name is also Dave (David). In the final scenes of Metal Gear Solid, Meryl wears an orange goose down vest similar to the one Forrest wears in Policenauts. Character designer Yoji Shinkawa stated that the staff purposely avoided mentioning her directly in the first sequel to Metal Gear Solid so that it could follow either of the two endings from the first game.

Appearances

Metal Gear Solid
Meryl is first introduced as the teenage daughter of Roy Campbell's deceased brother, Matt Campbell, who died during the Gulf War. Born to a house of military traditions, Meryl trained herself throughout her childhood in the 'arts' of soldiery. She admired the FOXHOUND unit (a high-tech special forces group), viewing the days when her uncle and Solid Snake were members as the unit's heyday, and wears a paint tattoo of the unit's old logo on her left shoulder. She joined the armed forces after graduating high school and received extensive psychotherapy to prevent any attraction to the opposite sex. Her weapon of choice is a Desert Eagle pistol.

She was recruited by the Next-Generation Special Forces (Genome Soldiers), a U.S. military unit, and assigned to Shadow Moses island in 2005 as an emergency replacement when several soldiers were reported missing. Following her arrival on the island, the unit involved with the exercise revolted along with members of FOXHOUND and took over the nuclear disposal site on the island and the Metal Gear REX weapon being developed there. Meryl refused to join in with the mutiny and was taken prisoner and placed on the same holding cell level with ArmsTech President Kenneth Baker, who gave her the card needed to activate REX. She manages to escape confinement and meets up with Solid Snake, and the two eventually begin working together. Meryl manages to stay hidden by disguising herself as one of the Genome Soldiers using the clothes she stole from Johnny Sasaki, the guard that was watching her cell. When Psycho Mantis takes control of Meryl's mind, Snake knocks her out before fighting Mantis. Later Meryl was shot and subsequently captured by FOXHOUND member Sniper Wolf. In an attempt to rescue Meryl and complete his mission, Snake engaged in a sniping duel with Wolf and was eventually lured into an ambush by her where he was also captured. Snake is then put through a series of torture trials by Revolver Ocelot; at this point, the player's actions dictate Meryl's fate. If the player successfully completes the torture section, Snake rescues a wounded Meryl in the final section of the game and they escape the facility together before their jeep crashes with Liquid Snake's, allowing them to have their deaths faked by Roy Campbell and Mei Ling. However, if the player submits to the torture, Snake discovers that Meryl has died during her imprisonment and he leaves her body to be buried by the collapsing structure with the remains of REX. When Snake informs Campbell of Meryl's death, Campbell reveals that Meryl was actually his biological daughter, conceived from an affair between him and his sister-in-law, and this secret was kept from Meryl by her biological parents and they never get the chance to tell her in this alternate ending (the subject of Meryl's paternity is brought up again in Metal Gear Solid 2: Substance during "Confidential Legacy", one of the non-canonical Snake Tales missions). The fictional publication In the Darkness of Shadow Moses by Nastasha Romanenko, offered as a bonus feature with Metal Gear Solid 2: Sons of Liberty, states that Snake and Meryl escaped together.

Metal Gear Solid 4: Guns of the Patriots
Meryl returns in Metal Gear Solid 4: Guns of the Patriots as the commander of Rat Patrol Team One (RAT PT 01), a fictional division of the United States Army Criminal Investigation Command sent to investigate Liquid Ocelot's private military company activities. She is now aware that Roy Campbell is her true father, but openly resents him due to the circumstances of her conception and his marriage with Rosemary, who is her own age. She reconciles with him at the end of the game. At first, Meryl dislikes her subordinate Johnny due to his clumsiness and stomach problems, but forgives him after learning he does not have nanomachines in his body and falls in love with him after he saves her life on their missions and ends up marrying him at the end of the story. She also appears in Metal Gear Online as a playable character.

Other appearances
Meryl is mentioned by name in Metal Gear: Ghost Babel. According to No. 4 in the Special Stage Select mode, she is said to be a U.S. Army recruit who is taken captive in order to coerce Colonel Campbell into leading the Gindra operation. Olga Gurlukovich, a character resembling Meryl, appears in Metal Gear Solid 2 and plays a vital role within the story. Hal Emmerich "Otacon" points her resemblance to Meryl in a radio conversation with Snake, which is emphasized further in the Japanese version by the fact that they shared the same voice actress. Meryl herself appears in Metal Gear Solid 2: Substance (an expanded version of MGS2) as a supporting character in a '"Snake Tales" mission titled "Confidential Legacy", in which she takes Olga's place as the boss of the Tanker stage. Her new polygonal model was also used in Substance's "Missions"' mode, as well as in "Casting Theater" mode.

Meryl appears in both volumes of the Metal Gear Solid Drama CD series. This radio drama adaptation of Metal Gear Solid contained non-canonical storylines set after the Shadow Moses incident featuring the characters from the game, where Meryl is an independent covert-op agent working for UN Peacekeeping Force and is wearing the same type of sneaking suit Snake wore in the original game, which was depicted by character designer Yoji Shinkawa in the CDs' booklet. Meryl's sneaking suit from the Drama CD was made into an unlockable extra in Metal Gear Solid: Integral, and later in Metal Gear Solid: The Twin Snakes (without the bandana). Meryl themed figures and action figures were produced by Yamato, McFarlane Toys, Studio Saru Bunshitsu, and Square Enix. Meryl also makes a cameo appearance in both Super Smash Bros. Brawl and Super Smash Bros. Ultimate, and her costume is available to download in LittleBigPlanet.

Reception

The character was mostly very well received by media for a variety of reasons. GameSpot's Shane Satterfield named Meryl as his favourite character for being "a hottie, plain and simple" and "a cute redheaded soldier with a tough-girl attitude and a husky voice." She was the first "gaming crush" of GamesRadar's David Meikleham, who commented: "This mangled mess of fugly 32-bit polygons and even fuglier textures was the equivalent of sex on a CD back in 1999. Sexy, sassy and with a strength that reminded me of Ellen Ripley, Meryl was a true pioneer for strong female gaming characters in a time when Lara Croft was a role model for lower back pain." Similarly, Wesley Yin-Poole of VideoGamer.com placed her on the top of his 2010 list of "video game crushes". Hanuman Welch of Complex ranked Meryl and Otacon ex equo at fourth place on his 2013 list of video game sidekicks that deserve their own titles.

In 2007, Rob Wright of Tom's Games listed Meryl as one of the 50 greatest female characters in video game history, adding that she should be played by Rachel McAdams in a live-action film adaptation. (In 2012, IGN proposed Emma Stone, Jennifer Lawrence or Alia Shawkat.) In 2008, Chip ranked her as the ninth-top "girl of gaming". In 2011, Peter Rubin and Ryan Woo of Complex ranked her and Solid Snake as their seventh-most-favourite video game couple. Meryl was also ranked by Complexs Larry Hester as the "42nd-hottest" woman in video games in 2012, and the magazine's Michael Rougeau ranked her as the 26th-greatest heroine in video game history in 2013. Also in 2013, Meryl was ranked as the seventh-most-attractive female video game character Scott Marley of Daily Record, as well as the eighth-sexiest female video game character by Scarlet Clearwater of Soletron. She was ranked as the 44th-best-looking game girl by GameHall's Portal PlayGame in 2014.

Debi Mae West's voice performances as the character was also well received; Kotaku's Brian Crecente accepted West to win the Spike Video Game Awards 2008 in the category "Best Performance by a Human Female". GameSpot's Collin Oguro featured the Peeping Tom-style scene featuring Meryl in MGS on the list of the ten greatest easter eggs in gaming. Meryl was included among "the hottest asses in gaming" by GamePro in 2007, also placing as number one "best ass in gaming" on the list by ZoominGames in 2012, who called her "the most important ass in gaming." Meryl was listed by Marissa Meli of UGO.com among the 20 best Jewish characters in video games as "the sexiest fictional Jew since Rhoda Morgenstern" in 2010 and was ranked as the 19th-top video game redhead by Game Informer in 2012. Meryl and Solid Snake together were included among the 25 best video game couples by IGN's Emma Boyes in 2012. IGN PlayStation Team included "Love Connection: Snake and Meryl" on their MGS4 wishlist in an open letter to Hideo Kojima.

However, GamesRadar's Chris Antista criticized the character for "fact that she's got the shoulders of a teamster topped with the fugly hair style of a LPGA Pro" and reminded her of Cooking Mama, and Kojima-approved Square Enix's Play Arts Kai line figure of Meryl was criticized by Tony Ponce of Destructoid. Kojima Productions representative Ryan Payton acknowledged criticism that Meryl's romance with Johnny felt forced, as many fans were expecting the character to be paired with Snake following the announcement of her appearance in the game, but then went on to state that he did not expect Snake and Meryl to be romantically paired while reading an early script.

See also
Women warriors in literature and culture

References

Characters designed by Yoji Shinkawa
Female characters in video games
Fictional agents of the United States Army Criminal Investigation Command
Fictional American Jews in video games
Fictional United States Army personnel
Fictional female military personnel
Fictional police officers in video games
Fictional secret agents and spies in video games
Metal Gear characters
Fictional soldiers in video games
Video game characters introduced in 1994
Woman soldier and warrior characters in video games